The Runaway Bride is a young adult fiction book, and the 96th title in The Nancy Drew Files mystery series by Carolyn Keene.

This book was first published by Simon Pulse (Simon & Schuster) in 1994 and has been remained in print since then. In 2001, this novel was re-published and distributed by Simon & Schuster Children's Books as a Nancy Drew 2-in-1 along with the popular Case #66: Tall, Dark and Deadly.

Plot
Nancy Drew and her friend George are in Japan to attend the wedding of their Japanese friend Midori Kato. The twist is that Midori appears very upset on the eve of her wedding and disappears during the commencement of her wedding with Ken Nakamura. It's indeed very surprising to note that Nancy is able to understand and read a bit of Japanese as well. This pulse-pounding novel also shows us some highly dangerous events occurring with Nancy while she's investigating the case. Also added are Mick's and Nancy's old romance which provides us some great moments of reading.

Editions
The Runaway Bride (Simon Pulse, 1994) 
Nancy Drew 2 in 1: Tall, Dark and Deadly/Runaway Bride (Simon & Schuster Children's Books, 2001) 

Nancy Drew books
1994 American novels
1994 children's books
Novels set in Tokyo
Japan in non-Japanese culture
Novels about missing people